Chabad philosophy comprises the teachings of the leaders of Chabad-Lubavitch, a Hasidic movement. Chabad Hasidic philosophy focuses on religious concepts such as God, the soul, and the meaning of the Jewish commandments.

Teachings are often drawn from classical Judaic teachings and Jewish mysticism. Classical Judaic writings and Jewish mysticism, especially the Zohar and the Kabbalah of Rabbi Isaac Luria, are frequently cited in Chabad works. These texts are used both as sources for Chabad teachings as well as material requiring interpretation by Chabad authors.

While Chabad was founded by Rabbi Shneur Zalman of Liadi, Chabad philosophy is based on the teachings of the Baal Shem Tov (founder of Hasidism) and the Magid of Mezritch (the Baal Shem Tov's successor and Rabbi Shneur Zalman's teacher and mentor).

The teachings of Rabbi Shneur Zalman of Liadi, the first Chabad Rebbe, form the basis of Chabad philosophy. Rabbi Shneur Zalman's teachings were greatly expanded upon by succeeding generations of Chabad Rebbes.

"Chabad" 
While other branches of Hasidism focused primarily on the idea that "God desires the heart", Shneur Zalman argued that God also desires the mind, and that the mind is the "gateway" to the heart. With the Chabad philosophy, he elevated the mind above the heart, arguing that "understanding is the mother of fear and love for God".<ref>Tanya', Shneur Zalman of Liadi, Chapter 13.</ref>

According to Jonathan Sacks, in Shneur Zalman's system,  represents "the creation in its earliest potentiality; the idea of a finite world as was first born in the divine mind.  is the idea conceived in its details, the result of contemplation.  is, as it were, the commitment to creation, the stage at which the idea becomes an active intention." While in Kabbalah there are clearly delineated levels of holiness, in Hasidism and Chabad philosophy these are grounded in the mundanities of people's inner lives. Sacks argues that this provided a psychological formulation that enabled the hasid to substantiate his mystical thoughts. "This was an important advance because bridging the gap between spiritual insight and daily behaviour had always been a problem for Jewish mysticism."Chabad philosophy argues that man is neither static nor passive nor dependent on others to connect to God.

Chabad often contrasted itself with other schools (termed by Chabad thinkers as ) of Hasidism. While all Hasidism have a certain focus on the emotions, Chagat saw emotions as a reaction to physical stimuli, such as dancing, singing, or beauty. Shneur Zalman, on the other hand, taught that the emotions must be led by the mind, and thus the focus of Chabad thought was to be Torah study and prayer rather than esotericism and song. As a Talmudist, Shneur Zalman endeavored to place Kabbalah and Hasidism on a rational basis.

Themes

Prayer

Prayer takes a central place in Chabad philosophy. In the Tanya, the desire to pray is referred to as the "desire for life".  Rabbi Shneur Zalman wrote to one Hasidic community, counselling those who were unable to remain at the synagogue for lengthy prayers, to leave early, rather than disturb the rest of the congregation.

In addition, prayer is considered to be a way of understanding and connecting to god. Far more emphasis is placed on prayer in chabad than in other sects of Judaism. Chabad mode of prayer includes lengthy contemplation of god's nature. One particular hasid, Rabbi Yekusiel Lepeler, is said to have at times prayed at such length, that by the time he finished the morning prayers, it was time for the afternoon prayers, and that lead into the evening prayers.

Contemplation
A central position in Chabad philosophy is the notion that the ultimate service of God can be achieved through contemplation and other cognitive processes, rather than through emotions. Chabad philosophy differs from the teachings of other Hasidic groups in this regard, placing greater emphasis on the use of the mind's cognitive faculties in religious devotional efforts.Weiner, Hebert, 9½ Mystics. Chabad philosophy provides a conceptual approach to understanding God and other spiritual matters, maintaining that contemplating such topics constitutes  ("the service of God").

Chabad philosophy also incorporated the teachings of Kabbalah as a means to deal with one's daily life and psyche. It teaches that every aspect of the world exists only through the intervention of God. Through an intellectual approach and meditations, Chabad teaches that one can attain complete control over one's actions.

 Torah study 
Shneur Zalman fought against the perception that was prevalent in the early years of Hasidism that the movement neglected Talmudic study by focusing too heavily on mysticism and obscurantism. He emphasized that mysticism without Talmudic study was worthless — even dangerous. Without Talmudic study, he argued, the mind could never be elevated — and if the mind is not elevated, the soul will starve. On the other hand, he argued that while Torah was to be the focus of all study, it was also important to integrate the Torah's teachings into one's life. In a letter to Joshua Zeitlin of Shklow, Shneur Zalman wrote: "The Hasidim, too, set aside time for study. The difference between them and the Misnagdim is this: the latter set time for study and they are limited by time, whereas the former make the Torah their path of life."

Shneur Zalman taught that Torah must be studied joyously – studying without joy is frowned upon. Thus, while Shneur Zalman emphasized that Hasidism focus on traditional Jewish scholarship rather than on mysticism, he was emphatic that this must be done with zeal and joy.

Bible stories
Rabbi Shneur Zalman stated that in the Bible, lofty teachings are transcribed in the form of stories. Rabbi Shneur Zalman quotes an unnamed source, stating that studying such biblical episodes simply as stories does not constitute the fulfillment of the Jewish commandment of "Torah study".

Kabbalah
In Chabad thought, the study of Kabbalah is seen, in some instances, not only as an act of religious study, but as a way to fulfill other Jewish commandments. In the Tanya, the study of Kabbalah is divided between the study of Seder Hishtalshelus (the Kabbalistic theory of the evolution of the universe), and the study of the esoteric meaning of the commandments. The study of the commandments is said to be a superior form of study, because it relates more closely to the performance of mitzvoth, and in some cases, is considered to take the place of the commandment itself.

, meaning "Order of Development/Evolution", refers in Kabbalah and Hasidic thought to the chain-like descent of spiritual worlds between God and Creation. Each spiritual -World denotes a complete realm of existence, resulting from its general proximity or distance to divine revelation. Each realm is also a form of consciousness reflected in this world through the psychology of the soul.

Love of God
According to Rabbi Shneur Zalman, there are two main forms of human love for God. One form, called the "natural love", is one that is brought about through the subjection of bodily drives, the other, "produced love", is the result of contemplation on topics which arouse such emotions.

Love of one's fellow Jew
 (Hebrew: , "love for one’s fellow Jew") is a biblical precept, greatly elaborated in Chabad thought.Shneur Zalman of Liadi. "Lekuttei Amarim Tanya: Chapter 32". Tanya. Kehot Publication Society. Brooklyn: New York.

Charity
In Chabad thought, charity is seen not only as a physical act of giving, but as a conduit for spiritual enlightenment.

 Unity 
Rabbi Menachem Mendel Schneerson advanced, in his writings and lectures, a proposed unity between opposing concepts. He proposed that it was possible to unite the mundane aspects of the world with the aspect of godliness in the world. Schneerson emphasized the significance of creating an "abode for God on this world". Consequently, he encouraged his followers to unite a life in the modern world with the teachings of Judaism. He felt that the world was not a contradiction to the word of God, and it was to be embraced rather than shunned.

Schneerson taught that the use of modern technology does not necessarily contradict a life of spirituality. For that reason, Chabad has consistently utilized modern technology to spread its message. Since its inception, Chabad have used the radio, and later television, satellite feeds, and the Internet to spread its message.

 is the process of manifesting the presence of God within the world. In , this concept is described as the ultimate purpose of creation.

 is also explored by the seventh Rebbe, Rabbi Menachem Mendel. Central to the  concept is the notion of sublimating the physical aspects of existence.

  
For when one feels that they are in the presence of God, they will feel a sense of insignificance and humility. And at the same time, the worshipper will feel a passionate adoration for God, and a desire to cleave to God.

  

In Chabad theology, the concept of messianism ( - ) is discussed at length.

Other concepts
A number of other important concepts in Chabad philosophy are referenced in scattered locations in Chabad literature. Though these topics were discussed in brief and were not the focus of any major work, new insights have been drawn from their treatment in Chabad thought.

Roles of Rebbe and Hasid
In its earlier formulations, Hasidic thought had elevated the rebbe to a level above that of typical hasid. A rebbe was closer to God, his prayers were more amenable to him, and a hasid should satisfy himself with attachment to the Rebbe and hence indirectly to God. A rebbe was to be a living example of perfection and would concern himself with intellectualism on behalf of the followers. According to Sacks, Chabad stressed the individual responsibilities of every Jew: "The rebbe...became more of a teacher and adviser, recognising the vocation of each of his followers, guiding them towards it, uncovering their strengths, and rejoicing in their achievements."

In Chabad thought, the Rebbe is not an intermediary between the Hasid and God. Rather, the role of the rebbe was to train followers to become spiritually self-sufficient and to turn to their Rebbe for instructions rather than intercession with God, miracles or blessings.

Hasidism traditionally demanded that every Hasid personally participate in the dissemination of Torah and Judaism to one's surroundings and seek out the benefit of one's fellow Jew. Rabbi Sholom Dovber Schneersohn said: "A Hasid is he who surrenders himself for the benefit of another." Beyond this, Chabad demands  (inwardness/sincerity): one should not act superficially, as a mere act of faith, but rather with inner conviction. The relationship the Chabad Hasid has with the Rebbe is called . "The Gashmiyus of a Rebbe". Chabad.org. http://chabad.org/library/article_cdo/aid/96057/jewish/The-Gashmiyus-of-a-Rebbe.htm

In a continuation of longstanding Chabad tradition, Rabbi Menachem Mendel Schneerson demanded that each individual exert themselves in advancing spiritually, and not rely on the Rebbe to do it for them.

Major texts

  

, Shneur Zalman's magnum opus, is the first schematic treatment of Hasidic moral philosophy and its metaphysical foundations. It is also known as —"Collected Sayings."  analyzes the inner struggle of the individual and the path to resolution. Citing the biblical verse "the matter is very near to you, in your mouth, your heart, to do", the philosophy is based on the notion that the human is not inherently evil; rather, every individual has an inner conflict that is characterized with two different inclinations, the good and the bad.

Some have argued that Shneur Zalman's moderation and synthesis saved the general Hasidic movement from breaking away from Orthodox Judaism. It allowed for mystically inclined Hasidim to be familiarized with traditional Jewish scholarship and observance, and for traditionalists to access Hasidism within the framework of Jewish scholarship.

 is a compilation of Chassidic treatises by the first Chabad Rebbe, Rabbi Shneur Zalman of Liadi. The treatises are arranged according to the Weekly Torah portion, and are studied regularly by Chabad Chassidim.

 is a two-volume work of Hasidic discourses on the books of Genesis and Exodus by the second Chabad Rebbe, Rabbi Dovber Schneuri. The work is arranged in a similar fashion as  following the weekly Torah portion.

 is a work by Rabbi Dovber Schneuri considered to be one of the most profound texts in Chabad philosophy.Donor Prints New Imrei Bina. COLlive.com. July 22, 2009. Accessed April 7, 2014.

  

, is a compilation of the Chasidic treatises by Rabbi Shalom Dovber Schneersohn, the Rebbe Rashab, from the Hebrew year 5666 (1905–06). This series of Chassidic essays is considered a fundamental work of Chabad mysticism.

  

, is a compilation of the Chasidic treatises by Rabbi Shalom Dovber Schneersohn, the Rebbe Rashab, from the Hebrew year 5672 (1911–12). This series of Chassidic essays is considered a fundamental work of Chabad mysticism.

Major compilations of these talks include:
 
 
 
 

Other major texts
Other major texts of Chabad philosophy include:
  by Rabbi Schneur Zalman
  by Rabbi Menachem Mendel Schneersohn, the third Chabad Rebbe
  by the third Rebbe
  by the third Rebbe
  by Rabbi Hillel Paritcher
  by Rabbi Yitzchak Eizik Epstein
  by Rabbi Yitzchak Eizik Epstein

Chabad  (lit. "discourses", singular  ) are the collective term for the essays and treatises of Hasidic thought written by the Chabad Rebbes.

 ("Today is day ...") is a short work compiled by Rabbi Menachem Mendel Schneerson at the behest of his father-in-law, Rabbi Yosef Yitzchok Schneersohn. The book is formatted as a calendar for the Hebrew year of 5703 (1942–43). The calendar contains a number of Chassidic insights and customs and is read by many Chabad members on a daily basis.

Other works
  by Rabbi Dovber Schneuri on the topic of repentance
  by Rabbi Menachem Mendel Schneerson, the seventh Chabad Rebbe
  (an encyclopedia on Chassidic Philosophy by Rabbi Yoel Kahn (8 volumes as of 2021)
 Chabad Philosophy by Dr. Nissan Mindel
 Deep Calling Onto Deep by Rabbi Immanuel Schochet
 The Longer Shorter Way by Rabbi Adin Steinzaltz

Contemporary works
Works by contemporary Chabad writers include the following:
 Toward a Meaningful Life - an English-language best-selling book on Chabad philosophy written by Simon Jacobson. The book distills Chassidic ideas and translates them into contemporary English. The book has sold over 300,000 copies and has been translated into a number of languages.
 Bringing Heaven Down to Earth - a book written by Rabbi Tzvi Freeman, a writer and editor for Chabad.org. Freeman's book transcribes the teachings of Chabad philosophy as short "meditations". The book contains 365 such meditations.Bringing Heaven Down to Earth.  KabbalaOnline. Accessed April 2, 2014.
 Communicating the Infinite'' - a scholarly work by Naftali Loewenthal, a Chabad Hasid and a professor of Jewish mysticism.
 Several books explaining the  written by Adin Steinsaltz.

Journals
A number of scholarly journals have been published by the Chabad movement; journal articles often cover topics in Chabad philosophy. Well-known Chabad journals include:
  – a journal published by the central Chabad yeshiva running from 1935 to 1938
  – a journal published by the Chabad kollel in Brooklyn during the 1980s
  – an important but short-lived journal published in Kfar Chabad, Israel in 1995-6
  – journal edited by Yehoshua Mondshein

See also
 Jewish philosophy
 Hasidic philosophy

References

External links
 Audio lectures on Chabad philosophy on Chabad.org
 Audio lectures on Chabad philosophy by Rabbi Shlomo Majesky

 
Chabad-Lubavitch (Hasidic dynasty)
Jewish philosophy